Coleophora taizensis is a moth of the family Coleophoridae. It is found in Yemen.

The wingspan is 8–9 mm.

References

taizensis
Invertebrates of the Arabian Peninsula
Moths of Asia
Moths described in 2007